Dalle Khursani, Akabare Khursani, red cherry pepper chilli or simply Dalle is a variety of chilli pepper primarily cultivated in Nepal, Indian state of Sikkim, and Darjeeling and Kalimpong districts of Indian state of West Bengal. Its pungency ranges between 100,000 to 350,000 SHU (Scoville heat units), similar to the Habanero chilli pepper. In 2020, Indian state of Sikkim received a Geographic Indication (GI) tag for the pepper. The GI tag was further extended to Darjeeling and Kalimpong districts on 14 September 2021.

Etymology 
The name Dalle Khursani literally translates to ‘round chillies’ in Nepali, owing to its physical attributes. In Nepal, it is also called Akabare Khursani (lit. king of chillies) or Jyanmara Khursani (lit. murderer chillies).

Serving methods
 Whole chilli: as a relish eaten with Dal bhat.
 Chopped: used in various vegetable and meat curries.
 Paste: as chutneys and sauces for Momo.
 Pickle: Dalle Achaar
 Fermented: fermented with yak–buttermilk

References 

Nepalese cuisine
Sikkim
Capsicum cultivars
Chili peppers